The Noise Next Door was a three-piece band, made up of triplet brothers from Leigh Park, England.  Craig, Scott and Ed Sutton were born on 30 May 1986, to Annette and Barry Sutton. They were the final three of an already large family consisting of four girls. Their father, Barry, was a musician and the three boys started a band at the age of thirteen called 'Trips'.

In 2004 John McLaughin, who has written for Busted, Blue and Sugababes, discovered them working in their local Asda. On 25 October 2004 they released their first single "Lock Up Your Daughters" (the b-side of which was "Ministry of Mayhem", the theme music to the CITV television show of the same name) which reached number 12 on the UK Singles Chart. Their next single, "Calendar Girls", reached 11.

The Noise Next Door were famous for their red hair. However, during May 2005, the band opted for a more mature image and cut off their red hair. They then released two more singles, "She Might", which made number 27 in the chart, and "Miss U" (originally "Dirty Girls").

The Noise Next Door recorded an album, Play It Loud, however they were dropped by their record label.

Since then their official website has been shut down.

The triplets also appeared in an ITV documentary entitled Identical Triplets: Their Secret World, which broadcast on 23 June 2008.

References

Triplets
Musical groups established in 2004
Sibling musical trios
English boy bands